Kick I (stylized as KiCk i; pronounced "kick one") is the fourth studio album by Venezuelan electronic record producer Arca. Recorded between Barcelona and London, the album was released on 26 June 2020 through XL Recordings. Kick I was presented with four singles: "Nonbinary", "Time", "Mequetrefe", and "KLK" featuring Rosalía. It also includes collaborations with Björk, Shygirl, and Sophie. The album was nominated for Best Dance/Electronic Album at the 63rd Annual Grammy Awards, as well as for Best Alternative Music Album at the 22nd Annual Latin Grammy Awards.

Kick I is the first entry of a Kick quintet. The rest of the entries were released in November–December 2021.

Background
Shortly after releasing her 62-minute long mix "@@@@@", on March 8, 2020 Arca revealed to Garage Magazine that she would be releasing her next album in the summer of 2020 and that it would feature Icelandic singer Björk and Spanish new flamenco alternative artist Rosalía. She had already previewed some of the songs in 2019 through live videos on her Instagram profile. Arca explained that "there was a clear intention [on the album] to allow every self to express itself. Not to decide how much air time each self would get, but to allow for modulation between them in a spontaneous way."

The album, consisting of 12 tracks, leaked on the internet on March 21, 2020 prior to any release date announcement. On May 20, 2020, Arca announced through social media the release date of the album as well as its tracklist and cover art, which was shot by Catalan artist Carlota Guerrero, Carlos Sáez and herself. The album was made available to preorder since that day on streaming platforms since it will only be released digitally internationally while there will be a CD and LP edition for the United Kingdom on July 17.

Composition
Kick I is an avant-pop, IDM, electronic, deconstructed club, and experimental pop album that takes influence from reggaeton, techno, bubblegum electro, industrial, electropop, trap, R&B, psychedelic music and PC Music. It is a departure from Arca's previous ambient work into more pop melodies, and has been called "an anti-pop pop album". The songs play with pop song structure, being described as "all bridge—stretches of evolution from one idea or mindset to the next." The operatic voice showcased on 2017's Arca can be heard on "No Queda Nada" and "Calor". The majority of the album uses lyrics as "textural elements rather than vehicles for ideas or stories" and features heavy use of rapping. The album touches on lyrical themes of identity, both gender and cultural. Ghersi's coming out as a non-binary trans woman was a big influence on the album, especially the first track and lead single "Nonbinary". Kick I contains mostly Spanish lyrics, connecting with Ghersi's Venezuelan roots, as well as her first lyrics in English. "Time" features "effervescent electropop" that has been compared to the work of Swedish singer Robyn. "Mequetrefe" is a reclamation of a derogatory Spanish term with a "bashed-up skeleton of a reggaetón rhythm".

Critical reception
{{Album ratings
| ADM        = 7.7/10
| MC         = 74/100
| rev1       = Allmusic
| rev1score  = | rev2       = Exclaim!| rev2score  = 9/10
| rev3       = The Guardian| rev3score  = 
| rev4       = The Line of Best Fit| rev4score  = 7.5/10
| rev5       = Loud and Quiet| rev5score  = 9/10
| rev6       = NME| rev6score  = 
| rev7       = The Observer| rev7score  = 
| rev8       = Paste Magazine| rev8score  = 8.8/10
| rev9       = Pitchfork| rev9score  = 7.5/10
| rev10       = Slant Magazine| rev10score  = 
| rev11       = Sputnikmusic
| rev11score  = 3.2/5
}}Kick I was met with generally positive reviews. At Metacritic, it holds an average score of 74 out of 100, based on 16 professional reviews. Chal Ravens of Pitchfork called Kick I Arca's "most accessible music to date" and praised Arca's increased confidence, but wished the lyrics were structured as more traditional pop songs. Liam Inscoe-Jones from The Line of Best Fit thought the album was enjoyable yet anticlimactic and that its sound were less fresh than it would've been years ago. Kaelen Bell, writing for Exclaim! called the album an "older sister" to Charli XCX's Pop 2 in its merging of pop and experimental music. Tom Hull gave the album a B-plus and found it "arch, arty, arcane", and "pretty unique".

Accolades

Track listing
All tracks written and produced by Alejandra Ghersi, unless noted otherwise.

Sample credits
 "Afterwards" contains elements of the poem "" by Antonio Machado
 "" incorporates elements of "" by Latin Dreams

Personnel 
Credits for Kick I'' adapted from CD liner notes.

 Arca – composition, production, vocals, mixing, cover image, artwork, design
 Carlos Sáez – additional arrangement (tracks 8, 11), cover image
 Jake Miller – vocal engineer (Björk; track 6)
 Alex Epton – mixing
 Enyang Urbiks – mastering
 Carlotta Guerrero – cover image
 Leo Foo – live photography
 Alex Raduan – black and white photography
 Roberto Rud – artwork photography
 Alfie Allen – design

Release history

References

2020 albums
Arca (musician) albums
Spanish-language albums
XL Recordings albums
Albums produced by Arca (musician)
Avant-pop albums